Hannah and Her Sisters is a 1986 American comedy-drama film which tells the intertwined stories of an extended family over two years that begins and ends with a family Thanksgiving dinner. The film was written and directed by Woody Allen, who stars along with Mia Farrow as Hannah, Michael Caine as her husband, and Barbara Hershey and Dianne Wiest as her sisters.

The film's ensemble cast also includes Carrie Fisher, Maureen O'Sullivan, Lloyd Nolan (who died four-and-a-half months before the film's release), Max Von Sydow, and Julie Kavner. Daniel Stern, Richard Jenkins, Fred Melamed, Lewis Black, Joanna Gleason, John Turturro, and Julia Louis-Dreyfus all have minor roles, while Tony Roberts and Sam Waterston make uncredited cameo appearances. Several of Farrow's children, including Soon-Yi Previn (who married Allen in 1997), have credited and uncredited roles, mostly as Thanksgiving extras.

Hannah and Her Sisters was, for a long time, Allen's biggest box office success (foregoing adjustment for inflation), with a North American gross of US$40 million. The film won Academy Awards for Best Original Screenplay, Best Supporting Actor, and Best Supporting Actress. It is often considered one of Allen's major works, with critics continuing to praise its writing and ensemble cast.

Plot
The story is told in three main arcs, with most of it occurring during a 24-month period beginning and ending at Thanksgiving parties, held at The Langham, hosted by Hannah, and her husband, Elliot.  Hannah serves as the stalwart hub of the narrative; most of the events of the film connect to her.

Elliot becomes infatuated with one of Hannah's sisters, Lee, and eventually begins an affair with her.  Elliot attributes his behavior to his discontent with his wife's self-sufficiency and resentment of her emotional strength.  Lee has lived for five years with a reclusive artist, Frederick, who is much older.  She finds her relationship with Frederick no longer intellectually or sexually stimulating, in spite of (or maybe because of) Frederick's professed interest in continuing to teach her.  She leaves Frederick after admitting to having an affair with somebody.  For the remainder of the year between the first and second Thanksgiving gatherings, Elliot and Lee carry on their affair despite Elliot's inability to end his marriage to Hannah.  Lee finally ends the affair during the second Thanksgiving, explaining that she is finished waiting for him to commit and that she has started dating someone else.

Hannah's ex-husband Mickey, a television writer, is present mostly in scenes outside of the primary story.  Flashbacks reveal that his marriage to Hannah fell apart after they were unable to have children because of his infertility.  However, they had twins who are not biologically his, before divorcing.  He also went on a disastrous date with Hannah's sister Holly, when they were set up after the divorce.  A hypochondriac, he goes to his doctor complaining of hearing loss, and is frightened by the possibility that it might be a brain tumor.  When tests prove that he is perfectly healthy, he is initially overjoyed, but then despairs that his life is meaningless.  His existential crisis leads to unsatisfying experiments with religious conversion to Catholicism and an interest in Krishna Consciousness.  Ultimately, a suicide attempt leads him to find meaning in his life after unexpectedly viewing the Marx Brothers' Duck Soup in a movie theater.  The revelation that life should be enjoyed, rather than understood, helps to prepare him for a second date with Holly, which this time blossoms into love.

Holly's story is the film's third main arc.  A former cocaine addict, she is an unsuccessful actress who cannot settle on a career.  After borrowing money from Hannah, she starts a catering business with April, a friend and fellow actress.  Holly and April end up as rivals in auditions for parts in Broadway musicals, as well as for the affections of an architect, David.  Holly abandons the catering business after the romance with David fails and decides to try her hand at writing.  The career change forces her once again to borrow money from Hannah, a dependency that Holly resents.  She writes a script inspired by Hannah and Elliot, which greatly upsets Hannah.  It is suggested that much of the script involved personal details of Hannah and Elliot's marriage that had been conveyed to Holly through Lee (having been transmitted first from Elliot).  Although this threatens to expose the affair between Elliot and Lee, Elliot soon disavows disclosing any such details.  Holly sets aside her script, and instead writes a story inspired by her own life, which Mickey reads and admires greatly, vowing to help her get it produced and leading to their second date.

A minor arc in the film tells part of the story of Norma and Evan.  They are the parents of Hannah and her two sisters, and still have acting careers of their own.  Their own tumultuous marriage revolves around Norma's alcoholism and alleged affairs, but the long-term bond between them is evident in Evan's flirtatious anecdotes about Norma while playing piano at the Thanksgiving gatherings.

By the time of the film's third Thanksgiving, Lee has married a literature professor she met while taking random classes at Columbia University. Hannah and Elliot have reconciled their marriage.  The film's final shot reveals that Holly is married to Mickey and that she is pregnant.

Influences
Part of the film's structure and background is borrowed from Ingmar Bergman's Fanny and Alexander (1982). In both films, a large theatrical family gather for three successive years' celebrations (Thanksgiving in Allen's film, Christmas in Bergman's). The first of each gathering is in a time of contentment, the second in a time of trouble, and the third showing what happens after the resolution of the troubles. The sudden appearance of Mickey's reflection behind Holly's in the closing scene also parallels the apparition behind Alexander of the Bishop's ghost. Additional parallels can be found with Luchino Visconti's 1960 film Rocco and His Brothers, which, besides the connection to its name, also uses the structural device of dividing sections of the film for the different siblings' plot arcs.

Cast

Production
The film was originally about a man who fell in love with his wife's sister. Woody Allen then re-read the novel Anna Karenina "and I thought, it's interesting how this guy gets the various stories going, cutting from one story to another. I loved the idea of experimenting with that."

He was particularly intrigued by the character of Nicholas Levin "who can't seem to find any meaning to life, he's terribly afraid of dying. It struck home very deeply. I thought it would be interesting to do one story about the relationship between three sisters and one story about someone else and his obsession with mortality."

Allen admits the role of Hannah was based on Farrow being "a romanticized perception of Mia. She's very stable, she has eight children now, and she's able to run her career and have good relationships with her sister and her mother. I'm very impressed with those qualities, and I thought if she had two unstable sisters, it would be interesting."

Allen says he was also inspired by the title. "I thought I'd like to make a film called Hannah and Her Sisters", he said, saying this prompted him to give Hannah two sisters. He was interested in making something about the relationship between sisters which he felt was more complex than that between brothers. "Maybe that comes from childhood; my mother had seven sisters and their children were female so all I knew were aunts and female cousins."

Mia Farrow later wrote that Allen had been intrigued about the subject of sisters for a long time. His earlier co-stars Janet Margolin and Diane Keaton both had two sisters each, and Farrow had three. She says Allen gave her an early copy of Hannah and Her Sisters saying she could play whatever sister she wanted, but that "he felt I should be Hannah, the more complex and enigmatic of the sisters ... whose stillness and internal strength he likened to the quality Al Pacino projected in The Godfather".

Farrow wrote, "It was the first time I criticized one of his scripts. To me, the characters seemed self-indulgent and dissolute in predictable ways. The script was wordy but it said nothing." She claims "Woody didn't disagree and tried to switch over to" an alternative idea, "but preproduction was already in progress, and we had to proceed".

She later elaborated:
It was my mother's stunned, chill reaction to the script that enabled me to see how he had taken many of the personal circumstances and themes of our lives, and, it seemed, had distorted them into cartoonish characterizations. At the same time he was my partner. I loved him. I could trust him with my life. And he was a writer: this is what writers do. All grist for the mill. Relatives have always grumbled. He had taken the ordinary stuff of our lives and lifted it into art. We were honored and outraged.

Farrow admitted "a small sick feeling ... deep inside me" which "I shared with nobody was my fear that Hannah and Her Sisters had openly and clearly spelled out his feelings for my sister. But this was fiction, I told myself ... So I put those thoughts out of my mind."

Release

Box office
Hannah and Her Sisters opened on February 7, 1986, in 54 theaters, where it grossed $1,265,826 ($23,441 per screen) in its opening weekend, the first time an Allen film had debuted in theaters in cities other than New York City. When it expanded to 761 theaters on March 14, it garnered a respectable $2,707,966 ($3,809 per screen). It went on to gross $40,084,041 in the United States (including a re-release the following year), and remains one of the highest-grossing Woody Allen films. Adjusted for inflation it falls behind Annie Hall (1977) and Manhattan (1979), and possibly also one or two of his early comedies. Midnight in Paris (2011) surpassed its box office as well.

The film was screened out of competition at the 1986 Cannes Film Festival.

Critical reception
On Rotten Tomatoes, the film holds an approval rating of 91% based on 56 reviews, with an average rating of 8.40/10. The site's critics consensus reads: "Smart, tender, and funny in equal measure, Hannah and Her Sisters is one of Woody Allen's finest films." On Metacritic, the film has a weighted average score of 90 out of 100, based on 12 critics, indicating "universal acclaim". The film received seven Academy Award nominations including Best Picture. Allen received two Academy Award nominations, winning one for Best Screenplay, Original and he earned a nomination for Best Director. His work on the film was also recognized with two BAFTA Awards.

Critics Siskel and Ebert each rated the film among the top three of the 1986 film year; Roger Ebert's 1986 review of the film called it "the best movie [Woody Allen] has ever made". Three years later when the two critics discussed their lists of the 10 best films of the 1980s, Ebert, who had included no comedies on his list, stated that had he been required to include one, it would have been Hannah And Her Sisters.

Vincent Canby, of The New York Times, gave the film a highly favorable review, going as far as to say that it "sets new standards for Mr. Allen as well as for all American movie makers".

A poll of 100 film critics named Hannah and Her Sisters the best film of the year, after it appeared on 71 individual top ten lists.

The American Film Institute (AFI) nominated the film for a ranking on its 1997 lists of the 100 greatest American films, the 100 funniest films, and the 100 greatest love stories. In 2005, the Writers Guild of America named Allen's script the 95th best film screenplay ever written.

In October 2013, the film was voted by readers of The Guardian as the fourth best film directed by Woody Allen.

In 2014, Calum Marsh of Slant Magazine named Hannah and Her Sisters as Allen's greatest film, praising its ensemble cast and Allen's "dense, heady script" for its "balancing act of conflicting desires and feelings". It was also listed as Allen's finest work in a joint article by The Daily Telegraph film critics Robbie Collin and Tim Robey, who compared its structure with the works of Anton Chekhov and lauded it as "perhaps the most perfectly assured braiding of comedy and drama in mainstream American film. It feels like the miraculous sweet spot between all of its filmmaker's many modes and tones – biting without being cruel, profound without seeming sanctimonious, warmly humane without collapsing into goo." It was ranked third among Allen's films in a 2016 poll of Time Out contributors, with editor Joshua Rothkopf singling out the character of Holly as "the kind of desperate, flailing Manhattanite that future director-writers would spin entire careers out of".

Accolades
Michael Caine and Dianne Wiest won Academy Awards for Best Supporting Actor and Best Supporting Actress for their portrayals of Elliot and Holly, respectively. Hannah and Her Sisters was the last film to win in both supporting acting categories until The Fighter in 2011. The film was also nominated for Best Art Direction-Set Decoration and Best Film Editing.

Allen received the 1986 award for Best Director from the U.S. National Board of Review of Motion Pictures, Dianne Wiest won Best Supporting Actress, and the film was nominated for Best Film.

In France, the film was nominated for a César Award for Best Foreign Film.

Academy Awards

BAFTA Awards

Golden Globes Award

Directors Guild Award

Writers Guild Award

New York Film Critics Circle

National Society of Film Critics

Legacy
In 1986, Mad magazine satirized the film as "Henna and Her Sickos" which was written by Debbee Ovitz with art by Mort Drucker.

In 2016, Olivia Wilde directed a live table reading of Hannah and Her Sisters at The New York Times small and packed-out Times Center theatre. The cast included, Wilde as Hannah, Rose Byrne as Lee, Uma Thurman as Holly, Michael Sheen as Elliott, Bobby Cannavale as Mickey, and Salman Rushdie as Frederick with Maya Rudolph, Jason Sudeikis and Justin Long filling out the supporting parts. Questlove served as the musical director who cued the musical selections ranging from jazz renditions of the Great American Songbook to Bach.

Soundtrack

Sola, perduta abbandonata – Segment from the opera "Manon Lescaut" by Giacomo Puccini – Orchestra del Teatro Regio di Torino – Conductor Angelo Campori
You Made Me Love You – by Thomas Joseph McCarthy and James V. Monaco – Performed by Harry James
I've Heard That Song Before – by Sammy Cahn and Jule Styne – Performed by Harry James
Bewitched – by Richard Rodgers and Lorenz Hart – Performed by Lloyd Nolan and Maureen O'Sullivan
Just You, Just Me – by Raymond Klages and Jesse Greer – Performed by Dick Hyman
Where Or When – by Richard Rodgers and Lorenz Hart
Concerto For Two Violins and Orchestra – by Johann Sebastian Bach – The Sofia Soloists Chamber Orchestra – Conducted by Vasil Kazandzhiev
Back to the Apple – by Frank Foster and Count Basie – Performed by Count Basie and His Orchestra
The Trot – by Benny Carter – Performed by Count Basie and His Orchestra
I Remember You – by Johnny Mercer & Victor Schertzinger – Performed by Dave Brubeck
Madama Butterfly – by Giacomo Puccini – Performed by Orchestra e Coro del Teatro dell'Opera di Roma – Conducted by John Barbirolli
Concerto For Harpsichord In F minor – by Johann Sebastian Bach – Performed by Gustav Leonhardt
You Are Too Beautiful – by Lorenz Hart and Richard Rodgers – Performed by Derek Smith
If I Had You – by Jimmy Campbell, Reginald Connelly, and Ted Shapiro – Performed by Roy Eldridge
I'm in Love Again – by Cole Porter – Performed by Bobby Short
I'm Old Fashioned – by Jerome Kern and Johnny Mercer – Sung by Dianne Wiest – Piano: Bernie Leighton
The Way You Look Tonight – by Jerome Kern and Dorothy Fields – Sung by Carrie Fisher – Piano: Bernie Leighton
It Could Happen to You – by Johnny Burke and Jimmy Van Heusen – Performed by Dick Hyman
Polkadots and Moonbeams – by Johnny Burke and Jimmy Van Heusen – Performed by Dick Hyman
Avalon – Written by Vincent Rose, Al Jolson, and Buddy G. DeSylva – Performed by Dick Hyman
Isn't It Romantic – by Richard Rodgers and Lorenz Hart – Performed by Derek Smith
Slip Into the Crowd – by Michael Bramon – Performed by Michael Bramon and The 39 Steps
Freedonia's Going to War – from Duck Soup (1933) – Music by Harry Ruby – Performed by Groucho Marx, Chico Marx, Zeppo Marx, and Harpo Marx with chorus

References

Bibliography

External links

 
 
 
 
 Hannah and Her Sisters at TV Guide (revised and shortened version of 1987 write-up originally published in The Motion Picture Guide)
 
 

1986 films
1986 comedy-drama films
1986 independent films
Adultery in films
American comedy-drama films
American independent films
Best Musical or Comedy Picture Golden Globe winners
Films about sisters
Films directed by Woody Allen
Films featuring a Best Supporting Actor Academy Award-winning performance
Films featuring a Best Supporting Actress Academy Award-winning performance
Films produced by Robert Greenhut
Films set in Manhattan
Films set in Columbia University
Films shot in New York City
Films whose director won the Best Direction BAFTA Award
Films whose writer won the Best Original Screenplay Academy Award
Films whose writer won the Best Original Screenplay BAFTA Award
Films with screenplays by Woody Allen
Midlife crisis films
Thanksgiving in films
1980s English-language films
1980s American films